The Dewar Cup Stalybridge  and originally called the Stalybridge Covered Courts (1965–1967) was an indoor tennis event held from 1965 through 1970 and played in Stalybridge, England as part of the Dewar Cup circuit  of indoor tournaments held throughout the United Kingdom.

History
In December 1965 the first edition of the Stalybridge Covered Courts was inaugurated. This tournament ran under this event name until the Scottish whisky firm Dewar's sponsored the Dewer Cup Circuit of events beginning in 1968. This tournament was then rebranded as the Dewar Cup Stalybridge until 1971, when Dewar's did not renew their sponsorship and the tournament ended.

Finals

Men's singles

Women's singles

Women's doubles

References

External links
https://thetennisbase.com/Stalybridge results

Defunct tennis tournaments in the United Kingdom
Tennis tournaments in England
Indoor tennis tournaments